J3 Sports Amilly Football is a French association football club. This club was created in 1949 by René Fouassier. The club wears the colours green and white. They are based in the town of Amilly, Loiret and their home stadium is the Stade Georges Clericeau. As of the 2022–2023 season, the club plays in the sixth tier of French football, after two seasons at the fifth tier.

The best result in French Cup is the 7th round.

References

External links
J3S Amilly club information at fff.fr 

Football clubs in France
Sport in Loiret
1949 establishments in France
Association football clubs established in 1949
Football clubs in Centre-Val de Loire